The Ant Bully is a video game based on the movie of the same name. It was released on July 24, 2006 alongside the theatrical release of the movie. The story and actions of the game correspond to that of the movie.

Gameplay

The game is broken down into missions, though the game follows a linear design. The game is a traditional action-adventure game, with players able to use different weapons to clear a mission and advance to the next level.

Plot
Players control the protagonist, Lucas Nickle, as he is shrunk to a miniature size and forced to work in an ant colony. He goes on many adventures throughout his backyard. From the Cactus Garden, to the Spiders lair, Lucas must overcome the challenges and become an ant. Getting in his way is the local wasp hive and the Exterminator. After overcoming many challenges, Lucas eventually has a mano-a-mano showdown. Lucas first must shoot the Exterminators ear with the Dart bow and avoid his hands and poison. Next, Lucas must blind the Exterminator with the Larva silk squirter. Eventually, Lucas and the wasps drive the Exterminator away after stinging him in the butt. Afterwards, Lucas collects the last of the Fire crystals and returns to normal size in 2006.

Reception

The Game Boy Advance, PlayStation 2 and GameCube versions received "mixed" reviews, while the PC and Wii versions received "generally unfavorable reviews" according to video game review aggregator Metacritic.

Detroit Free Press gave the PS2 version a score of three stars out of four and stated: "The best part of the game is Lucas' maneuverability in getting from Point A to Point B. In some instances, he must glide on a rose pedal. In others, he summons other ants through telepathy, and the group either flings Lucas through the air or operates as an impromptu ladder." The Times gave the same console version a score of three stars out of five and said, "This must be one of the first instances in which a video game actually seems like the natural format. But even here, as you acquire weapons, ride wasps and beat up tiny-huge creatures, it seems never to aspire to much beyond adequacy."  However, The Sydney Morning Herald gave the PC and PS2 versions two stars out of five, saying, "The twitchy movement makes it unnecessarily difficult to target enemies with your primitive ant weapons (a lock-on button turns out to be little help) and it's all too easy to fall when carefully crawling up walls."

References

External links
 
 Official website

2006 video games
Action-adventure games
Behaviour Interactive games
Game Boy Advance games
GameCube games
Midway video games
PlayStation 2 games
Single-player video games
Video games about ants
Video games about insects
Video games based on films
Video games developed in Canada
Video games scored by Alexander Brandon
Video games using Havok
Wii games
Windows games